Ida Ehre (9 July 1900 in Přerov, Moravia – 16 February 1989 in Hamburg) was an Austrian-German actress and theatre director and manager.

Biography 
Ehre’s father was a hazzan. She learned acting at the University of Music and Performing Arts, Vienna. She made her acting debut at the Stadttheater in Bielitz, and appeared in theatres in Budapest, Cottbus, Bonn, Königsberg, Stuttgart and at the National Theatre Mannheim. From 1930, she appeared at the Lessing Theater in Berlin.

In Nazi Germany, she was not allowed to work as an actress because she was Jewish, and so she helped in the gynaecolological practice of her husband, Dr. Bernhard Heyde (1899–1978), in Böblingen. After the Kristallnacht, she planned to emigrate to Chile with her husband and her daughter Ruth (born 20 October 1927 in Mannheim), but the ship they were on was ordered to return to Hamburg because of the outbreak of World War II. She was later arrested by the Gestapo and interned in the concentration camp Fuhlsbüttel for six weeks.

After the war, on 10 December 1945 she opened the Hamburger Kammerspiele theatre in the Hartungstraße in Rotherbaum in a theatre building that had been used by the Jüdischer Kulturbund until 1941. In addition to modern German drama such as Wolfgang Borchert‘s ‘’The Man Outside’’ (German: ‘’Draußen vor der Tür’’), she brought modern pieces by playwrights from other countries for the first time in Germany, including plays by Jean Anouilh, T. S. Eliot, Jean Giraudoux, Jean-Paul Sartre and Thornton Wilder. She continued managing the theatre until her death from a heart attack in 1989.
After her death, she was given an honorary grave in Ohlsdorf Cemetery next to Gustaf Gründgens.

Honours
In 1971, she was a member of the jury at the 21st Berlin International Film Festival.

In 1984, she became the first female honorary citizen of Hamburg. She was also made an honorary doctor by the University of Hamburg. In 1971, she won the Schiller Prize of the City of Mannheim.

In the Altstadt quarter of Hamburg, part of the square of Gerhart-Hauptmann-Platz, named after Gerhart Hauptmann, was renamed Ida-Ehre-Platz in 2000. In 2001, the Jahn-Schule in Eimsbüttel, Hamburg was renamed the Ida-Ehre-Gesamtschule following a second vote after a first vote had preferred the name Gesamtschule am Grindel.

Films 
 In Those Days (German: In jenen Tagen), 1947, Regie: Helmut Käutner, mit Willy Maertens
  The Prisoner (1949)
 You Don't Shoot at Angels (1960)
 The Dead Eyes of London (German: Die toten Augen von London), 1961, Regie: Alfred Vohrer, mit Joachim Fuchsberger
 The Gypsy Baron (1962)

Bibliography
Ida Ehre, Helmut Schmidt: Gott hat einen größeren Kopf, mein Kind.... Rowohlt, Reinbek, 
Ida Ehre, Sepp Schelz: Zeugen des Jahrhunderts. Ida Ehre. Ullstein, 1999

Further reading 

Anna Brenken: Ida Ehre. Ellert und Richter, Hamburg 2002, 
Wolfgang Homering (Hrsg.): Ida Ehre im Gespräch mit Sepp Schelz. Ullstein, Berlin 1999, 
Verena Joos: Ida Ehre. "Mutter Courage des Theaters". Econ und List, München 1999, 
 Michaela Giesing, Ida Ehre and Hamburg's Kammerspiele Theater, in: Key Documents of German-Jewish History, October 16, 2017

References

External links 
 

 

1900 births
1989 deaths
20th-century Czech people
20th-century German actresses
German stage actresses
German film actresses
German radio actresses
Jewish actresses
German theatre managers and producers
German theatre directors
Czech Jews
20th-century German Jews
People from Přerov
Commanders Crosses of the Order of Merit of the Federal Republic of Germany
University of Music and Performing Arts Vienna alumni
Burials at the Ohlsdorf Cemetery